Musadi is a commune of the city of Mwene-Ditu in the Democratic Republic of the Congo.

Populated places in Lomami
Communes of the Democratic Republic of the Congo